Midoora, also known as Midru, is a piedmont, agglomerated rural settlement in the Awantipora Tehsil of Pulwama district in Indian-administered Jammu and Kashmir.  It is at a distance of  30 km from Srinagar and 8 km from the main town Tral and 7 km from Awantipora. Its nearby villages are Batagund, Check, and Noorpora. In  the Northwest of it stands the majestic Wasturwan.

Climate 
Midoora has a moderate climate. Its geographical location largely defines the moderate climate.  It can be described as cool in the spring and autumn, mild in the Summer, and cold in the winter. 
Summer is usually mild and relatively dry. The hottest month is July and the coldest are December–January.

Demographics 

At the 2011 Census of India, Midoora had a population of 4441. The sex ratio of the Village is 927 with 2305 males and 2136 females. There are a total of 580 households. The total number of children under the age of 6 is 1302. A total of 113 people constituting 2.54% of the total population belonged to Schedule Tribe (ST).

Education 
According to the 2011 Census, Midoora has 2199 literates, making the literacy rate 70.05% .  There are many primary, middle and a couple of secondary schools in service, to the Children and Adolescents of the Village. Some prominent Schools are:

 Government High School 
 Jalali English Medium High School (Public School)
 Government Middle School
Modern Public Mission School (Privately Owned)
Al-Furqan Public School (Privately Owned)

Notable people
Prof. A.G. Ahanger [MS; MCh (CVTS)] - Director SKIMS & Ex-Officio Secretary to Government.

References 

Villages in Pulwama district